T. Richard Rice (born 1944) is an American Seventh-day Adventist theologian and author. He is a leading proponent of "open theism". As of 2007 he is professor of theology and philosophy of religion at Loma Linda University in California.

Biography 
Rice received an M.Div. degree from Andrews University in 1969, and an MA and Ph.D. in Christian theology from the University of Chicago in 1972 and 1974, respectively.  He taught at La Sierra University, in Riverside, California until 1998, moving then to Loma Linda University, where he was (until his retirement July 2020) a Professor of Religion in the areas of Theology and Philosophy of Religion. He has served as a church pastor.

Open theism 

Rice introduced the term "open theism" in his 1980 book The Openness of God: The Relationship of Divine Foreknowledge and Human Free Will. The book was published by Seventh-day Adventist publisher Review and Herald, but proved controversial within the church and was not reprinted. Later, evangelical Clark Pinnock contacted Rice to convey his deep appreciation of the book, and gave it a positive review. It was republished by Pinnock's publisher Bethany House under the title God's Foreknowledge & Man's Free Will. In 1994, Rice and other theologians contributed to the book The Openness of God: A Biblical Challenge to the Traditional Understanding of God, which was edited by Pinnock.

David Larson has claimed, "although it may seem new to some, in less detailed forms the basics of “Open Theism” have been taught at Loma Linda University for about fifty years [as of 2007], beginning at least as early as long-time professor Jack W. Provonsha."

Publications 
Rice has authored numerous books, and has published articles in the Journal of Religion, Religious Studies Review, Andrews University Seminary Studies, Ministry, Insight and Spectrum. His books include:

See also 

 Open theism
 Progressive Adventism

References 

Seventh-day Adventist theologians
Seventh-day Adventist religious workers
Living people
American Seventh-day Adventists
Andrews University alumni
University of Chicago Divinity School alumni
1944 births